Zanjabeel Asim Shah is a Pakistani screenwriter. She is known for writing scripts for television serials and working as head of content for several private network channels. She won the Pakistan International Screen Award for Best TV writer and was nominated three times for the Lux Style Awards.

Career 

Shah started her career in 2010, working at Geo TV, where she served as the head of production for several television serials. She first wrote the series Saat Pardon Mein in 2012 for the same channel. She gained critical success with revenge-romance Marasim which revolves around the revenge of a mother through her son that she suffered as bride. She later wrote serials such as Yeh Mera Deewanapan Hai, about a romantic couple with a huge age difference between them, and Balaa, the story of a limping girl who destroys others' lives due to her own insecurities. Balaa was a commercial success and earned her critical acclaim as well. She also wrote mystery-thriller Cheekh and teen-romance Pyar Ke Sadqay, both of which gained her critical acclaim.

She also worked as head of content on other television networks such as ARY Digital and A-Plus TV.

Notable work

Television 
{|class="wikitable sortable"
! Year
! Title
! Network
! Notes
|-
|2012
|Saat Pardon Mein
|rowspan="2"|Geo Entertainment
|
|-
|2014
|Bashar Momin
|
|-
|2014
|Marasim
|rowspan="3"|A-Plus TV
|
|-
|2015
|Yeh Mera Deewanapan Hai
|
|-
|2018
|Mere Bewafa
|
|-
|2018
|Balaa
|ARY Digital
|
|-
|2020
|Pyar Ke Sadqay
|Hum TV|
|-
|2021
|Koyal|Aaj Entertainment
|
|-
|2021
|Fitoor|rowspan="2"|Geo Entertainment
|
|-
|2022
|Dil Zaar Zaar|
|-
|2022
|Fraud|ARY Digital
|
|}

 Awards and accolades 

 2021 - Pakistan International Screen Awards - Best TV Writer for Pyar Ke Sadqay Nominated - 2014 - Lux Style Awards - Best TV Writer for Marasim Nominated - 2017 - Lux Style Awards - Best TV Writer for Balaa Nominated - 2021 - Lux Sryle Awards - Best TV Writer for Pyar Ke Sadqay''

References 

Year of birth missing (living people)
Living people
21st-century Pakistani women writers
Pakistani screenwriters
Lux Style Awards